The 2014–15 UCF Knights men's basketball team represents the University of Central Florida during the 2014–15 NCAA Division I men's basketball season. The Knights compete in Division I of the National Collegiate Athletic Association (NCAA) in the American Athletic Conference (The American). The Knights, in the program's 46th season of basketball, were led by fifth-year head coach Donnie Jones, and play their home games at the CFE Arena on the university's main campus in Orlando, Florida. They finished the season 12–18, 5–13 in The American to finish in ninth place. They lost in the first of the AAC tournament to East Carolina.

Previous season
In the previous year, the Knights finished the season 13–18, 4–14 in The American in a tie for eighth place. They advanced to the quarterfinals of the conference tournament where they lost to Cincinnati.

Departures

Incoming Transfers

Incoming recruits

Recruiting Class of 2015

Roster

Schedule and results

|-
!colspan=9 style="background:#000000; color:#BC9B6A;"| Exhibition

|-
!colspan=9 style="background:#000000; color:#BC9B6A;"| Non-Conference Regular Season

|-
!colspan=9 style="background:#000000; color:#BC9B6A;"| American Regular Season

|-
!colspan=9 style="background:#000000; color:#BC9B6A;"| 2015 American Athletic Conference tournament

References

UCF Knights men's basketball seasons
UCF
UCF Knights
UCF Knights